A flare, also sometimes called a fusée, fusee, or bengala, bengalo in several european countries, is a type of pyrotechnic that produces a bright light or intense heat without an explosion. Flares are used for distress signaling, illumination, or defensive countermeasures in civilian and military applications. Flares may be ground pyrotechnics, projectile pyrotechnics, or parachute-suspended to provide maximum illumination time over a large area. Projectile pyrotechnics may be dropped from aircraft, fired from rocket or artillery, or deployed by flare guns or handheld percussive tubes.

History

The earliest recorded use of gunpowder for signaling purposes was the 'signal bomb' used by the Chinese Song Dynasty (960–1279) as the Mongol-led Yuan Dynasty (1271–1368) besieged Yangzhou in 1276. These soft-shelled bombs, timed to explode in midair, were used to send messages to a detachment of troops far in the distance. Another mention of the signal bomb appears in a text dating from 1293 requesting their collection from those still stored in Zhejiang. A signal gun appears in Korea by 1600. The Wu I Thu Phu Thung Chih or Illustrated Military Encyclopedia, written in 1791, depicts a signal gun in an illustration.

Civilian use

In the civilian world, flares are commonly used as signals, and may be ignited on the ground, fired as an aerial signal from a pistol-like flare gun, or launched from a self-contained tube. Flares are commonly found in marine survival kits.

Maritime distress signal
Red flares, either sent as a rocket or held in the hand, are widely recognized as a maritime distress signal.

The International Convention for the Safety of Life at Sea (SOLAS) has standards for visual signals, including both handheld and aerial flares. Handheld flares must burn for at least one minute at an average luminosity of 15,000 candelas, while aerial flares must burn for at least 40 seconds with a 30,000-candela average luminosity. Both should burn in a bright red color. Nations that are members of SOLAS require vessels to carry visual signals on board.

Fusee

Another type of flare is the fusee, which burns for 5–60 minutes with a bright red light. Fusees are commonly used to indicate obstacles or advise caution on roadways at night; in this usage they are also called highway flares, road flares, or ground flares. They are commonly found in roadside emergency kits.

Fusees are also known as railroad flares and are commonly used to perform hand signals in rail transport applications. Since they can be used only once, fusees nowadays are usually intended for emergency use (as opposed to the lanterns typically used during normal operating conditions). However, in the days before train radio communications, fusees were used to keep trains apart in dark territory. A railroad fusee was timed to burn for 10 minutes, and quantities were dropped behind a train to ensure a safe spacing. If a following train encountered a burning fusee, it was not to pass until the fusee burned out. Fusees made specifically for railroad use can be distinguished from highway fusees by a sharp steel spike at one end, used to embed the fusee upright in a wooden railroad tie.

In forestry and firefighting, fusees are sometimes used in wildfire suppression and in the ignition of controlled burns. They are especially effective in igniting burnouts or backburns in very dry conditions, but not so effective when fuel conditions are moist. Since controlled burns are often done during relatively high humidity levels (on the grounds that they could not be safely contained during periods of very low humidity), the driptorch is more effective and more often used. Fusees are also commonly carried by wildland firefighters for emergency use, to ignite an escape fire in surrounding fuels in case of being overrun by a fire if no other escape routes are available.

Calcium phosphide is often used in naval flares, as in contact with water it liberates phosphine which self ignites in contact with air; it is often used together with calcium carbide which releases acetylene.

Law enforcement also may use flares (either propped on a biped or laid flat) to signal traffic hazards or that a road is blocked, often as a more visible replacement for traffic cones. Law enforcement in the United States usually use magnesium-based flares that last from 15–30 minutes.

Military use

Maritime signal flare
In 1859, Martha Coston patented the Coston flare based on early work by her deceased husband Benjamin Franklin Coston. It was used extensively by the US Navy during the Civil War and by the United States Life-Saving Service (the precursor to the US Coast Guard) to signal to other ships and to shore.

Illumination

In 1922, a "landing flare" was an aerial candle attached to a parachute and used for landing an airplane in the dark. The flare burned for less than four minutes and the candlepower was about 40,000 lumens.

Countermeasure

A special variety of flares is used in military aircraft as a defensive countermeasure against heat-seeking missiles. These flares are usually discharged individually or in salvos by the pilot or automatically by tail-warning devices, and are accompanied by vigorous evasive maneuvering. Since they are intended to deceive infrared missiles, these flares burn at temperatures of thousands of degrees, incandescing in the visible spectrum as well.

Tripflares

Flares connected to tripwires are used to guard an area against infiltration. The flare begins burning when the tripwire is triggered, providing both alarm and illumination.

Regulation
Under the UN hazard number system, pyrotechnic flares are designated class 1.4 explosives.

Several U.S. states, including California and Massachusetts, have begun regulating levels of potassium perchlorate, which can be unsafe at certain levels in drinking water.  Contaminated drinking water can lead to such symptoms as gastric irritation, nausea, vomiting, fever, skin rashes, and even fatal aplastic anemia (a reduction in all types of blood cells).

Chemistry
Flares produce their light through the combustion of a pyrotechnic composition. The ingredients are varied, but often based on strontium nitrate, potassium nitrate, or potassium perchlorate, mixed with a fuel such as charcoal, sulfur, sawdust, aluminium, magnesium, or a suitable polymeric resin. Flares may be colored by the inclusion of pyrotechnic colorants. Calcium flares are used underwater to illuminate submerged objects. *Note- Fusees manufactured in the United States no longer use potassium perchlorate as an oxidizer and do not contain aluminium or magnesium.

Perchlorate flare health issues
Many in-service colored signal flares and spectrally balanced decoy flares contain perchlorate oxidizers. Perchlorate, a type of salt in its solid form, dissolves and moves rapidly in groundwater and surface water. Even in low concentrations in drinking water supplies, perchlorate is known to inhibit the uptake of iodine by the thyroid gland. While there are currently no US federal drinking water standards for perchlorate, some states have established public health goals or action levels, and some are in the process of establishing state maximum contaminant levels. For example, the US Environmental Protection Agency has studied the impacts of perchlorate on the environment as well as drinking water. California has also issued guidance regarding perchlorate use.

US courts have taken action regarding the use of perchlorate in manufacturing pyrotechnic devices such as flares. For example, in 2003, a federal district court in California found that the Comprehensive Environmental Response, Compensation and Liability Act (CERCLA) applied because perchlorate is ignitable and therefore a “characteristic” hazardous waste.

See also

References

Further reading

External links 
 

Association football culture
Chinese inventions
Distress signals
Emergency communication
Gunpowder
Incendiary weapons
Lighting
Maritime safety
Missile countermeasures
Pyrotechnics
Military history of the Song dynasty
Wildfire suppression equipment
Military history of the Yuan dynasty